Jonathan Daniel Brown is an American actor and director. He is the star of Kid Cannabis and got his start with the role of J. B. in Project X.

Career
Brown was offered one of the lead roles in the film Project X after a national open casting call. He, Thomas Mann and Oliver Cooper were three unknown actors when cast in the film.

In 2014, he starred in the lead role in the film Kid Cannabis. In 2017, his directorial debut Horseshoe Theory received a jury prize award at the Slamdance Film Festival. Brown was also a member of the leftist pop-culture podcast Struggle Session. On February 19, 2019, it was announced that Brown had decided to leave the show.

Filmography

Film

Television

References

External links

1989 births
American male film actors
Living people
Male actors from California